Three-Sided Coin is the first compilation album by Canadian rock band Nickelback, being a Japan-exclusive release by Roadrunner International. Released on June 11, 2002, it contains songs from the band's first three studio albums: Curb (1996), The State (1998), and Silver Side Up (2001). Three-Sided Coin also includes "Yanking Out My Heart", a track which was recorded during the Silver Side Up recording sessions yet not included on the album. "Yanking Out My Heart" was previously included on The Scorpion King soundtrack earlier in March 2002; the song later appeared on the special edition of The Long Road in 2003.

Track listing

Tracks 6 and 8 from Curb (1996)
Tracks 2, 4, 5, and 7 from The State (1998)
Tracks 1, 3, 9, and 10 from Silver Side Up (2001)
Track 11 from The Scorpion King soundtrack (2002)

Personnel

Nickelback
Chad Kroeger – lead vocals, guitars
Ryan Peake – guitars, vocals
Mike Kroeger – bass guitar
Brandon Kroeger – drums (tracks 6 and 8)
Ryan Vikedal – drums (tracks 1-5, 7, 9-11)

Production
Larry Anschell – producer, engineer, mixing (Curb)
Dale Penner – producer, engineer (The State)
GGGarth Richardson – mixing (The State)
Nickelback – producer (The State, Silver Side Up and "Yanking Out My Heart")
Rick Parashar – producer (Silver Side Up and "Yanking Out My Heart")
Joey Moi – engineer (Silver Side Up and "Yanking Out My Heart")
Randy Staub – mixing (Silver Side Up and "Yanking Out My Heart")

Additional personnel
Ron Burman – A&R
Bryan Coleman – management (Union Entertainment Group)
Jason Noto, Scott Sandler – art direction, design
Daniel Moss, Chapman Baehler – photography
Lynda Kusnetz – creative director

References

Nickelback albums
2002 compilation albums
Roadrunner Records compilation albums